Eupithecia albisecta is a moth in the  family Geometridae. It is found in Colombia.

References

Moths described in 1911
albisecta
Moths of South America